Charles Loftus Haines was Dean of Ardfert from 1947 until 1959.

Haines was educated at Trinity College, Dublin and  ordained in 1913. He began his ecclesiastical career with  curacies at Guilcagh, West Wycombe and Dromod. During World War I he was a Chaplain to the Forces. He was Rector of Kilcrohane from 1924 until 1959.

He died on 6 January 1950.

References

Alumni of Trinity College Dublin
Deans of Ardfert